Johann Eriksson (born March 10, 1978) is a Swedish sprint canoer who competed in the early 2000s. He was eliminated in the semifinals of the K-1 1000 m event at the 2000 Summer Olympics in Sydney.

References
Sports-Reference.com profile

1978 births
Canoeists at the 2000 Summer Olympics
Living people
Olympic canoeists of Sweden
Swedish male canoeists
Place of birth missing (living people)